Plavé Vozokany is a village and municipality in the Levice District in the Nitra Region of Slovakia.

History
In historical records the village was first mentioned in 1327.

Geography
The village lies at an altitude of 185 metres and covers an area of 23.132 km². It has a population of about 855 people.

Ethnicity
The village is approximately 98% Slovak.

Facilities
The village has a public library and football pitch.

External links
http://www.statistics.sk/mosmis/eng/run.html

Villages and municipalities in Levice District